Bonnie Roupé, (simplified Chinese 柔向盈) is a Swedish-born international businesswoman and social entrepreneur, best known as the founder of Bonzun, a health company providing pregnant women and parents with unbiased evidence based medical information. Bonzun gives 15-20 million people in 35 of China's most deprived areas direct access to Internet and qualified maternal care. She is the innovator behind the Kexuema-app for blood testing that was launched together with the largest state owned hospitals in China, Beijing Obstetrics and Gynecology Hospital. In 2004 she started a publishing house and founded the Swedish Golf Magazine for women, Red Tee, the first niched sports magazine for women. In 2005 she was named the most promising entrepreneur of the Year in Sweden and in 2012 she was listed as one of Sweden's super talents. She was rewarded Innovation Against Poverty by SIDA 2012 for Bonzun's work spreading medical information in the countryside in China. In 2001 and 2003 Bonnie sailed on around Svalbard and from Greenland to the United States, making her one of few people to cross the Arctic Sea, Greenland Sea, Labrador Sea and North Atlantic Ocean on a 47.7 feet sailboat.

Awards and recognition
 2005 - Most Promising Entrepreneur Affärsvärlden
 2012 - Supertalent Veckans Affärer
 2012 - Innovation Against Poverty
 2014 - Female Innovator of the Year
 2019 - Entrepreneur of the Year

References

 Radio Interview, Startup Podden (January, 2014) http://www.startuppodden.se/2014/01/8-bonnie-roupe-grundare-bonzun/
 Maria Svemark (2014). ”Bonnies idé räddar kvinnoliv”. Hemmets veckotidning.
 Affärsvärlden
 Aboutbonzun
 Bonzun
 Lena Nilsson (2007). ”Hon vågade -och vann”. Populär Hälsa.
 6.0 6.1 Kreafonbloggen
 Populär Hälsa nummer 2 2007
 Veckans affärer Supertalanger 2012
 aboutbonzun.com
 Cyzone
 Jan Hökerberg (2014). Chris Taylor. red. Dragon News.
 ”En sajt som räddar liv”. Läst 20141105.
 Jenny Hedelin (2014). ”Vårdapp lyfter i Kina”. Dagens Industri (Stockholm)

Living people
21st-century Swedish businesswomen
21st-century Swedish businesspeople
Social entrepreneurs
1975 births